Perur is a neighbourhood located on western side of Coimbatore in the Indian state of Tamil Nadu.

Perur may also refer to:

 Perur Pateeswarar Temple
 Perur Santhalinga Swamigal
 Perur Chettipalayam
 Perur (state assembly constituency)
 Perur, Nalgonda district